Pine Creek Lake is a lake in McCurtain County and Pushmataha County, Oklahoma, USA. It is located east of Rattan and north of Sobol.

The lake, which was begun in 1963 and became operational built in 1969, impounds the waters of Little River, Pine Creek, and Turkey Creek. It is managed by the U.S. Army Corps of Engineers for flood control, water supply, fish and wildlife, and recreational purposes.  The adjacent Pine Creek Wildlife Management Area extends this mission.

Lake details

Dam details
There is an uncontrolled saddle spillway, that is a gravity ogee weir.

Pine Creek Lake divides the Little River into upper and lower reaches.  It is one of two impoundments on the river, the other being Millwood Lake in Little River County, Arkansas.

The wildlife management area covers and is adjacent to Little River and Pine Creek Lake.

References 

Lakes of Oklahoma
Bodies of water of McCurtain County, Oklahoma
Lakes of Pushmataha County, Oklahoma